Siti Munirah Jusoh, (born 25 May 1987 in Terengganu) is a former professional squash player who represented Malaysia. She reached a career-high world ranking of World No. 33 in October 2012.

Career
In 2012, she was part of the Malaysian team that won the bronze medal at the 2012 Women's World Team Squash Championships.

References

External links 

Malaysian female squash players
Living people
1987 births
21st-century Malaysian women